Fahad Mirza is a Pakistani actor, model, plastic surgeon and sculptor.

He is best known for his debut role as Essa in 2012 drama serial Bari Aapa. He has also appeared in Mutthi Bhar Mitti (2008), Main Deewani (2014) and Shanakht (2014) for which he was nominated as Hum Award for Best Supporting Actor at 3rd Hum Awards.

Life and career
Fahad was born on 26 April 1981 to a Mughal family in Karachi, Pakistan. He did his graduation in MBBS from Dow Medical College and trained in Plastic and Reconstructive Surgery from Liaquat National Hospital. Fahad started his career by modeling in 2007 during his studies and then auditioned for a role in Hum TV's drama serial Bari Aapa and eventually got a role, previously he had a small role in a telefilm Mutthi Bhar Mitti by Umera Ahmed.

In 2014 he appeared in two drama serial of Hum TV, Main Deewani and Shanakht for which he garnered widespread acclaim and positive response. In addition to acting, he also appeared in several fashion shows and television commercials. In 2014, he starred alongside his wife Sarwat Gillani in the highly acclaimed short film Baat Cheet.

Fahad met actress Sarwat Gilani in 2003 when both were students and began a relationship that lasted for three years. After ten years in 2013, Fahad met Sarwat at her theater play Dhaani where afterwards both got engaged on 11 October 2013 and they wed on 14 August 2014 in a private ceremony. Together they have two sons.

Filmography

Television

Films

Webseries

TV commercials

 Oreo
 Tapal Tea

Awards and nominations

References

External links
 
 

Living people
Pakistani male television actors
Pakistani male models
Male actors from Karachi
Dow Medical College alumni
Pakistani plastic surgeons
Pakistani sculptors
1985 births